Ruoti
is a town and comune in the province of Potenza, in the Basilicata region of southern Italy.

Geography
It is bounded by the comuni of Avigliano, Baragiano, Bella, Picerno, and Potenza.

Notes and references

Cities and towns in Basilicata